A priest hunter was a person who, acting on behalf of the English and later British government, spied on or captured Catholic priests during Penal Times. Priest hunters were effectively bounty hunters. Some were volunteers, experienced soldiers or former spies.

England
As the Catholic bishops during the reign of Queen Mary were dead, imprisoned or in exile, and those priests they had ordained were dying out or converting to Protestantism. William Allen conceived the idea for a seminary for English Catholic priests at Douai, where several of the chief posts were held by professors who had fled Oxford upon the reimposition of Protestantism in England. The English College at Douai was founded as a Catholic seminary in 1569. Similar colleges also came about at Douai for Scottish and Irish Catholic clergy, and also Benedictine, Franciscan and Jesuit houses. Other English seminaries for the training of priests from and for England and Wales included ones in Rome (1579), Valladolid (1589), Seville (1592) and Lisbon (1628).

Elizabeth I reinstated the Protestant Bible and English Mass, yet for a number of years, she refrained from persecuting Catholics. After the Rising of the North of 1569 and the papal bull  (1570), plus the threat of invasion by Catholic France or Spain assisted by English Catholics led the Crown to adopt ever-increasing repressive measures.

An act of 1571 (13 Eliz. c. 2) not only forbade the publishing of any documents from the Pope, but also the importation and distribution of crosses, beads, pictures, and tokens called "Agnus Dei" (a Lamb of God sealed upon a piece of wax from the Paschal candle blessed by the Pope). From the 1570s missionary priests from continental seminaries came to England secretly. In the autumn of 1577, Queen Elizabeth's Principal Secretary, Francis Walsingham canvassed the Anglican bishops for a list of recusants in their dioceses and how much each was worth. Cuthbert Mayne (1544–1577) was the first English Catholic "seminary priest" to be executed under the laws of Elizabeth I.

The Religion Act 1580 (23 Eliz.1 c. 1) fined and imprisoned those who celebrated the Mass or attended a Mass. The Jesuits, etc. Act 1584 (27 Eliz.1, c. 2) commanded all Catholic priests to leave the country in forty days or be punished for high treason unless, within the 40 days, they swore an oath to obey the Queen. Those who harboured them, and all those who knew of their presence and failed to inform the authorities would be fined and imprisoned for felony. It also provided an incentive to informers by according them one-third of any forfeitures.

This was followed by another in 1585 (27 Eliz. c. 2) that declared that anyone ordained a priest outside the Queen's dominions who then came into the country was deemed a traitor, and anyone harbouring them, a felon. Nicholas Woodfen (Devereux) and Edward Stransham, who had both studied at the English College, Douai were executed at Tyburn on 21 January 1586.

One of the most infamous priest hunters of Elizabeth's reign was Sir Richard Topcliffe, who delighted in personally torturing and playing mind games with the priests whom he apprehended. Described by Father John Gerard as "old and hoary and a veteran in evil," Topcliffe ultimately fell from favour with the Queen and was imprisoned very soon after his role in the arrest, trial, and execution of the underground priest and secret poet, Fr. Robert Southwell, S.J.

Methods
Walsingham tracked down Catholic priests in England and supposed conspirators by employing informers and intercepting correspondence. Shortly before setting off for England, Edmund Campion learned that a letter detailing their party and mission had been intercepted and that they were expected in England. It was a common practice for a spy to pose as a Catholic and engage a suspect in conversation in the hope of eliciting an incriminating statement. This technique led to the arrest and execution of Richard Simpson in 1588.

Apostate Catholics and former priests and seminarians were particularly helpful in this regard. A London priest hunter named Sledd had been a servant to Dr. Nicholas Morton at the English College in Rome. After George Haydock had been betrayed to Sledd by one of Haydock's old acquaintances, Sledd went to the house where Haydock took his meals, and recognized the priest Arthur Pitts and law student William Jenneson.

George Eliot
In early July 1581, John Payne, while staying on the estate of Lady Petre in Warwickshire, was denounced by informer George Eliot, a spy in the employ of Robert Dudley, 1st Earl of Leicester. Eliot became a spy, agreeing to seek out recusant Catholics, in order to avoid a pending murder charge. He had insinuated himself into a position in the Petre household where he then proceeded to embezzle sums of money.

Eliot followed that success shortly thereafter with the capture of Edmund Campion, who had arrived in London on 24 June 1580 disguised as a jewel merchant. Eliot used his past experience working in a Catholic household to gain admittance to a Mass Campion was saying at Lyford Grange in Oxfordshire. Elliot then returned with an armed company and searched the house until they discovered the priest hole where Campion and two associates were hiding.

Wadsworth et al
They used a number of informants within Catholic communities. Starting in the 1640s, James Wadsworth, Francis Newton, Thomas Mayo, and Robert de Luke formed a partnership to hunt down Catholics in the London area and handed them over to the authorities for a reward. Between November 1640 and the summer of 1651 over fifty individuals were turned over to the government. Some were executed, some banished, and some reprieved.

Ireland

A 1709 Penal Act demanded that Catholic priests take the Oath of Abjuration, and recognise the Protestant Queen Anne as Supreme Head of the Church of England and, by implication, in Ireland. Priests who refused to conform were arrested and executed. This activity, along with the deportation of priests who did conform, was a documented attempt to cause the Catholic clergy to die out in Ireland within a generation. Priests had to register with the local magistrates to be allowed to preach, and most did so. Bishops were not able to register.

The reward rates for capture varied from £50–100 for a bishop, to £10–20 for the capture of an unregistered priest; substantial amounts of money at the time. The work was dangerous, and some priests fought in self-defence.

The hunters were outcasts in their communities, and were viewed as the most despised class. Often when someone arrested or killed a priest, local rapparees would retaliate by assassinating a British soldier or even the priest hunter. If they could not kill the priest hunter, local Irish Catholics even would seek revenge by burning down his house and farmyard. The risks were the same for known informants.

The Penal Law imposed outlawry upon the remaining clerics, and they were forced to say Mass in secret, and in remote locations. High-risk worship at Mass rocks became common. The attending priest would usually wear a veil, so that if an attendee was questioned, they were able to say truthfully that they did not know who had said the Mass.

The distribution of priest hunters was uneven; some local police forces chose to overlook both the presence of priests and their activity at Mass rocks.

Messr. Turner
Around 1680, persecution of Catholics heated up in reaction to Titus Oates' claims of a non-existent Catholic conspiracy aimed at assassinating King Charles II of England and massacring the Protestants of the British Isles. As a result, a Catholic priest named Fr. Mac Aidghalle was murdered while saying mass at a mass rock that still stands atop Slieve Gullion, in County Armagh. The perpetrators were a company of redcoats under the command of a priest hunter named Turner. Redmond O'Hanlon, the de facto Chief of the Name of Clan O'Hanlon and leading local rapparee, is said in local tradition to have avenged the murdered priest and in so doing to have sealed his own fate.

John O'Mullowny
Perhaps the most notorious was John O'Mullowny of Ballyheane, in County Mayo, an alcoholic and horse thief who took up the profession in return for a pardon from the hangman's noose, c. 1715. In 1726, he was killed by a priest he was pursuing, and his body was thrown in a lake, before later being recovered and buried.

See also
 Forty Martyrs of England and Wales
 Irish Catholic Martyrs
 List of Catholic martyrs of the English Reformation § Decrees of Elizabeth I

References

Sources
 de Burca, Eamon. South Mayo Family Research Centre Journal, 1987.
 McGee, Thomas D'Arcy. The priest hunter : a tale of the Irish penal laws, 1844.
 Power, Denis. Archaeological inventory of County Cork, Volume 3: Mid Cork, 9467. ColorBooks, 1997.

Further reading
 Gerard, John. The Autobiography of a Hunted Priest

External links
 The Irish priests in the penal times (1660-1760): from the state papers in H. M. Record Offices, Dublin and London, the Bodleian Library, and the British Museum (1914) archive.org.

History of Christianity in Ireland
17th century in Ireland
18th century in Ireland
Anti-Catholicism in Ireland
Anti-Catholicism in the United Kingdom
Penal Laws in Ireland
Religion in the British Empire
Obsolete occupations